General elections were held in Southern Rhodesia on 29 April 1924, the first elections to the new Legislative Assembly following the granting of responsible government to the colony. The result was a comprehensive victory for the Rhodesia Party, which had been formed by the supporters of responsible government, who won 26 out of the 30 seats.

Electoral system
No change was made to the basic electoral procedure which continued to be the single non-transferable vote, or First past the post system, cast by means of the secret ballot.

The Letters Patent granting the colony the right to self-government in 1923 made no change to the pre-existing franchise. The law provided that voters must have been resident in Southern Rhodesia for at least six months, and have the ability to complete the claim form for the electoral register in their own handwriting if the registrar required, and to write from dictation 50 words in the English language. In addition, voters had to meet one of three criteria for their financial means: either occupy property worth £150 in their Electoral District, or own a registered mining claim within the colony (for which residence was not required), or receive annual salary of £100 in the colony.

The Letters Patent created a legislative assembly with 30 members, and for simplicity the 15 electoral districts set the previous year for the Legislative Council were used for the new assembly, but with each district returning two members. Voters were therefore entitled to two votes.

Political parties
Since the previous election, and the grant of responsible government, the Responsible Government Association had organised itself under the leadership of Sir Charles Coghlan into the Rhodesia Party and been appointed as the new government. In addition the Rhodesia Labour Party, which had been formed some years before, entered into the election. However a substantial number of candidates fought as Independents on their own record. In general these candidates represented small farmers, small businesses and mining interests.

Campaign
The Labour Party had supported the Responsible Government Association in its campaign for a separate government for the colony, and in opposition to union with South Africa, and members of both parties hoped to reach agreement on an allocation of seats between them so that they did not oppose each other. Negotiations were unsuccessful and where candidates of the parties were fighting for seats, the fight between them became bitter. The independent candidates were also in opposition to the 'establishment' party and many stressed the need for a strong opposition in the new Assembly.

Results

By constituency

Note: As the Midlands result was a tie between Boggie and Austen, the election was determined by a drawing of lots, which was supervised by a Judge of the High Court, on 15 May 1924.

Changes during the Assembly

Mazoe

Sir Francis Newton resigned on 26 August 1924 on appointment as High Commissioner of the United Kingdom to Southern Rhodesia, precipitating a byelection in his electoral district which was held on 26 September 1924.

Salisbury South

George Elcombe resigned his seat on 10 January 1927 and a byelection was held on 8 March 1927.

Bulawayo North

Sir Charles Coghlan died on 28 August 1927 and a byelection was held on 18 November 1927.

Midlands

William James Boggie died on 8 February 1928 and a byelection was held on 18 April 1928.

Defections
There were a number of changes within the assembly. Robert Dunipace Gilchrist 'crossed the floor' to sit as an opposition Independent in 1925. He was followed in May 1927 by Francis Leslie Hadfield and Max Danziger. In June 1927, the Progressive Party was formed by Harry Bertin, Robert Alexander Fletcher, Robert Dunipace Gilchrist, George Edward Gilfillan, Francis Leslie Hadfield, Frank William Frederick Johnson, John Louis Martin, Frederic Philip Mennell and Sir Ernest William Sanders Montagu. This party campaigned for a pro-white immigration policy, the development of Matabeleland, and establishing African reserves. It was opposed to monopolies, and sought reform and depoliticisation of the Civil Service.

References

 Source Book of Parliamentary Elections and Referenda in Southern Rhodesia 1898–1962 ed. by F.M.G. Willson (Department of Government, University College of Rhodesia and Nyasaland, Salisbury 1963)
 Holders of Administrative and Ministerial Office 1894–1964 by F.M.G. Willson and G.C. Passmore, assisted by Margaret T. Mitchell (Source Book No. 3, Department of Government, University College of Rhodesia and Nyasaland, Salisbury 1966)

Southern Rhodesia
Elections in Southern Rhodesia
1924 in Southern Rhodesia
Southern Rhodesia